Sömmerda (German: Landkreis Sömmerda) is a Kreis (district) in the north of Thuringia, Germany. Neighboring districts are (from the north clockwise) the districts Kyffhäuserkreis, the Burgenlandkreis in Saxony-Anhalt, the district Weimarer Land and the district-free city Erfurt, and the districts Gotha and Unstrut-Hainich-Kreis.

History
The district Sömmerda was created in 1952. In 1994, the districts of Thuringia were reorganized, and the district Sömmerda was enlarged significantly by adding municipalities from the dissolved districts Artern and Erfurt-Land.

Geography
The main river in the district is the Unstrut. The nearby town of Kölleda is known locally as the Peppermint City because of its long history of growing aromatic and medicinal herbs.

Coat of arms
The coat of arms shows the three historic states which Sömmerda belonged to in the past. In the left is the Saxon symbol, to the right is the lion as symbol of Thuringia, and in the bottom is the Wheel of Mainz as the symbol of Mainz.

Towns and municipalities

References

External links
 Official website (German)

 
Districts of Thuringia